Thunder Rider is the comeback sixth album by German heavy metal band Majesty. It was released on January 4, 2013, through Noiseart Records in both standard and deluxe editions. The deluxe edition included an additional DVD which contained a documentary titled Metal Union. The DVD features interviews with bands and journalists and tries to unveil the secret of heavy metal music. The song, "Metal Union", which concludes the album is a musical conversion of this topic. It features guest appearances by Sven D´Anna (Wizard), Hannes Braun (Kissin´ Dynamite), Mat Sinner (Primal Fear / Sinner), Patrick Fuchs (Ross The Boss), Andreas Babushkin (Paragon) and Marta Gabriel (Crystal Viper).

Track listing

Personnel
 Tarek "MS" Maghary - lead vocals
 Tristan Visser - guitar
 Alex Palma - bass
 Jan Raddatz - drums

References

External links 
 
 Album website on record label website

2013 albums
Majesty (band) albums